Arthur William Turner OBE DVSc DSc FAA (1900–1989) was an Australian veterinary scientist and bacteriologist.

References

Fellows of the Australian Academy of Science
1900 births
1989 deaths
Australian bacteriologists
Australian Officers of the Order of the British Empire
Australian veterinarians
Male veterinarians